Fauna of Croatia may refer to:
 List of birds of Croatia
 List of mammals of Croatia

See also
 Outline of Croatia